In aviation, tankering is the practice of loading more fuel than necessary for a trip, to take advantage of lower fuel prices at the airport of origin, or when fuel is in short supply at the destination airport. Tankering increases the weight of the aircraft and therefore total fuel consumption, however it can still reduce costs if the difference in fuel prices is great enough. Fuel prices can vary by over 50% within Europe, with price differences of 20% to 30% between major airports. Modern flight management systems can calculate the optimum amount of fuel to tanker for given origin and destination fuel prices.

In the ECAC area, full tankering is performed on approximately 15% of flights and partial tankering on a further 15% of flights.

While tankering reduces costs for airlines, it increases fuel consumption and therefore carbon emissions. Taxing aviation fuel does not necessarily help reduce fuel consumption, because by increasing the price difference between jurisdictions which tax jet fuel and jurisdictions which do not, it can incentivise tankering.

A European Commission report in 2021 proposed banning tankering, and obliging aircraft to uplift fuel at all EU airports.

References

External links

Aircraft operations
Aviation fuels